Rudolf Kunz was a German former professional motorcycle road racer. He competed in Grand Prix motorcycle racing from 1964 to 1977. 

In 1965, Kunz set a land speed record of  riding a supercharged 50 cc Kreidler motorcycle at Bonneville Speedway. His career peak came in 1970 when he finished the season ranked third in the 50 cc world championship behind Ángel Nieto and Aalt Toersen.

References 

Year of birth missing
German motorcycle racers
50cc World Championship riders
Place of birth missing